Kheyrabad-e Gohar (also Romanized as Kheyrābād-e Gohar and Kheyrābād-e Gahar; also known as Khairābād and Kheyrābād) is a village in Howmeh Rural District, in the Central District of Behbahan County, Khuzestan Province, Iran. At the 2006 census, its population was 638, in 122 families.

References 

Populated places in Behbahan County